Redbourn railway station served the village of Redbourn, Hertfordshire, England from 1887 to 1964 on the Nickey Line.

History 
The station opened on 16 June 1887 by the Midland Railway. To the opposite of the station was the goods yard which had three sidings, two of them serving the goods shed. The platform was raised by two and a half inches in 1913. The station closed to passengers on 16 June 1947 and closed to goods on 6 July 1964. The track was lifted in 1982 and the platform was demolished shortly after.

References

External links 

Disused railway stations in Hertfordshire
Former Midland Railway stations
Railway stations opened in 1887
Railway stations closed in 1947
1887 establishments in England
1964 disestablishments in England
Redbourn
Railway stations in Great Britain opened in the 19th century